The 1928 Arizona gubernatorial election took place on November 6, 1928. Despite a fairly poor economy, a 15-point loss by Al Smith for the Arizona electoral votes, and having served for nearly 6 full terms, Hunt only narrowly lost the general election. Other state Democrats like Senator Ashurst and Representative Douglas both won re-election. John C. Phillips became the second Republican to serve as Arizona Governor, and the first to beat Hunt in a general election.

John Calhoun Phillips was sworn in for his first and only term as Governor on January 7, 1929.

Democratic primary

Candidates
George W. P. Hunt, incumbent Governor, former Ambassador to Siam
James H. Kerby, then-incumbent Secretary of State

Results

Republican primary

Candidates
John Calhoun Phillips, former state House and Senate member.
 John Hunt Udall, clerk of the Arizona Superior Court.
 Celora M. Stoddard, member of the Arizona State Senate from 1921 to 1923.

Results

General election

References

Bibliography

1928
1928 United States gubernatorial elections
Gubernatorial
November 1928 events in the United States